The Women's 500 m time trial was one of the 8 women's events at the 2008 UCI Track Cycling World Championships, held in Manchester, United Kingdom.

16 cyclists from 12 countries participated in the contest. The final was held on March 26.

World record

Final

References

Women's 500 m time trial
UCI Track Cycling World Championships – Women's 500 m time trial